The Cross of Faithful Service was instituted by King Carol I in 1906, as a two class cross. In early 1948, together with the Order and Medal of Faithful Service as well as all the traditional Romanian orders, it was discontinued by the Communist Government of Romania.

In 2000 it was re-instituted together with the Order and Medal, as a three class cross. It is the highest state decoration for people without higher education, and the third highest in the National System of Decorations of Romania.

References

External links

World Medal Index - Republic of Romania: Cross of Faithful Service

Romanian decorations
Military awards and decorations of Romania
National Order of Faithful Service
Awards established in 1906
1906 establishments in Romania